Indus Media Group (also abbreviated as, IMG) was a Pakistani company broadcasting a mix of free-to-air news and entertainment channels via satellite.

IMG owns and operates the Indus brand of television channels in various global markets. It owns and operates the channels "Indus Vision", "Indus Music" and "Indus Plus".

Company 
Indus Media Group (IMG) owns and operates Indus TV Network (Private) Limited and the Indus brand of television channels in various global markets.

Brands

Indus Plus 
Indus Media launched a 24-hour channel called Indus Plus offering a blend of periodic news updates, infotainment, and entertainment with each segment dedicated to targeting specific audiences. Its shows included talk shows, cooking shows, celebrity interviews, news, views, current affairs, sports, stock markets updates, women's programmes, and prime time interactive games shows. It has been replaced by Indus News.

Indus TV 
Indus TV is a 24-hour Pakistani tv channel of general entertainment, infotainment and news. It is owned by Indus Media Group. It telecasts talk shows, dramas, films, biblical teachings and programs for children. It also telecasts and targets ethnic viewers in markets outside their native regions for people in the Middle East, North America, and Europe.

Indus Vision 

Indus Vision is Pakistan's first independent satellite channel and a general entertainment channel. It operates 24 hours per day, offering Urdu programming that includes dramas, sitcoms, entertainment & magazine shows, cooking shows, fashion shows, talk shows, television films, kids programming (including the popular 3-hour segment Indus Chotu), and music. It was founded in 2000 and is owned by Indus Media Group.

Programmes 
Its programs include:
 Ambulance
 Dil Ki Baat
 Eye Vision
 Home Show
 Indus Chotu
 Indus Yoga
 Kaanch Ki Gudiya
 Kanpur Se Katas Tak
 Mera Naam Hay Mohabat
 Pak Raha Hai Kia
 Sawal
 Sitaron Ki Shaam
 Sola Singhar
 Studio3
 Sub Set Hai
 Wajood-e-Laraib

Indus Music 
Indus Music is a Pakistani music channel owned by Indus Media Group. It has interactive VJs, comic fillers, celebrity interviews, theme shows and live concerts. It broadcasts only Pakistani music and is home of IM Awards. It was founded in 2001 and it is owned by Indus TV Network.

In terms of format, IM compares with any international popular music channel offering round-the-clock-music.

IM-MTV Asia 
In order to bring the world together through music, IM has come up with the IM-MTV Asia Collaboration.

Indus Music is currently offered in Pakistan and 64 other countries.

IM is replaced by MTV Pakistan, where as a segment of Indus Music International runs on the sister channel G Kaboom.

G Kaboom 

G Kaboom is a 24-hour Pakistani music channel. When it was started, it broadcast music, entertainment, news shows, red carpets, fashion shows, lifestyle and infotainment programmes. Since 2010, it is broadcasting music only.

See also 
MTV Pakistan

References 

Mass media companies of Pakistan
Mass media in Pakistan
Television stations in Karachi
Urdu-language television channels
English-language television stations in Pakistan
Television channels and stations established in 2000